The de Havilland DH.89 Dragon Rapide is a 1930s short-haul biplane airliner developed and produced by British aircraft company de Havilland. Capable of accommodating 6–8 passengers, it proved an economical and durable craft, despite its outdated plywood construction.

Developed during the early 1930s, the Dragon Rapide was essentially a smaller, twin-engined version of the four-engined DH.86 Express, and shared a number of common features, such as its tapered wings, streamlined fairings and Gipsy Six engines. First named the "Dragon Six", the type was marketed as "Dragon Rapide" and later simply known as the "Rapide". Upon its introduction in summer 1934, it proved to be a popular aircraft with airlines and private civil operators alike, attaining considerable foreign sales in addition to its domestic use.

Upon the outbreak of the World War II, many of the civil Rapides were impressed into service with the Royal Air Force (RAF) and Royal Navy. Referred to in military service by the name de Havilland Dominie, the type was employed for radio and navigation training, passenger transport and communications missions. British training aircraft had names with educational associations, and dominie is a Scots term for a school teacher.

Hundreds of additional Dominies were also constructed during the war. Other Rapides continued to be operated by British airlines throughout the war under the auspices of the Associated Airways Joint Committee (AAJC). Postwar, many military aircraft were returned to civilian service. Shortly after the end of the Second World War, de Havilland introduced a Dragon Rapide replacement, the de Havilland Dove.

Design and development

Origins

During summer 1933, the de Havilland aircraft company commenced work upon an aircraft to meet an Australian requirement, producing a four-engined faster passenger aircraft capable of seating ten passengers, the DH.86 Dragon Express. An important feature of the DH.86 was the newly developed and powerful Gipsy Six engine, a six-cylinder variant of the four cylinder Gipsy Major engine. The DH.86 would serve as the a key starting point for the later DH.89.

During late 1933, a team at de Havilland, led by aircraft designer Arthur Ernest Hagg, began working on a new design, intended to be a faster and more comfortable successor to the earlier DH.84 Dragon. The new aircraft was, in effect, a twin-engined, scaled-down version of the four-engined DH.86 Express. It shared many common features with the earlier DH.86 Express, including its tapered wings, streamlined fairings and fuselage, as well as the same Gipsy Six engines. However, the DH.89 demonstrated none of the operational vices of the Express.

On 17 April 1934, the prototype conducted its maiden flight at Hatfield Aerodrome, Hertfordshire. Flown by senior de Havilland test pilot H.S. Broad, it was powered by a pair of  Gypsy Six engines. Even prior to the prototype's first flight, plans to proceed with serial production of DH.89 had already received the go-ahead from management. Upon the conclusion of trials, the prototype was sold.

By November 1934, series production of the Rapide had reached full swing. Originally referred to as the "Dragon Six", the aircraft was first marketed as the "Dragon Rapide", although the type later came to be popularly referred to as simply the "Rapide". Prior to the outbreak of the Second World War, 205 aircraft were manufactured for airlines and other private owners all around the world. The Rapide is perhaps the most successful British-built short-haul commercial passenger aircraft to be produced during the 1930s.

Further development
In response to the issuing of Specification G.18/35 by the British Air Ministry, de Havilland decided to design and produce a single prototype of a modified Rapide for undertaking coastal reconnaissance. Trials using the prototype, K4772, were performed between April and June 1935 at RAF Martlesham Heath and RAF Gosport. However, it ultimately lost out to its rival, the Avro Anson. K4772 was later used by the Royal Aircraft Establishment (RAE) in automatic landing trials before being broken down for spares. Work on a militarised version of the Rapide was not wasted as multiple sales were soon completed with other military customers, the first of which being to the Spanish government in December 1935.

Sensing demand for the type, de Havilland continued to modify the Rapide's design following its entry to service, creating both refinements and entirely new derivatives as a result. Aiming to produce a faster version of the Rapide, a smaller, lighter and externally cleaner version, designated as the DH.90 Dragonfly, emerged; first flying in August 1935, the DH.90 failed to achieve a similar rate of sales to the Rapide and production was terminated in 1938 after 67 aircraft had been completed. In November 1935, the 60th airframe to be produced, G-ADWZ, was modified and used by de Havilland as a trials aircraft.

In response to the announcement of an air race between Britain and Johannesburg, South Africa, de Havilland's design team produced a specialised variant of the Rapid, designated as the DH.92 Dolphin.

In November 1936, in response to suggestions that the addition of flaps would aid in landing, a single Rapide was modified in order to explore their functionality. Based on this performance, in February 1937, de Havilland announced that flaps would be fitted to all production aircraft from that year onwards, while other improvements such as a downwards-facing recognition light and metal propellers could be fitted as options. From 1937, to signify the fitting of improved trailing edge flaps, aircraft thus equipped were accordingly re-designated as DH.89A; earlier-built Rapides were commonly retrofitted to this standard during their service life as well.

Operational history

Prewar operations

During July 1934, the first production Rapide, G-ACPM, performed the type's public debut at Hatfield with its entry into the 1934 King's Cup Race. While having achieved an average speed of 158 MPH, G-ACPM had to be withdrawn from the race during Heat 9 of Round 2 when the wing sustained damage caused by hail while flying over Waddington, Lincolnshire. Another purpose-built Rapide, ZK'-ACO, was entered into the 1934 MacRobertson Air Race; fitted with three additional fuel tanks within the fuselage to extend the aircraft's range to 1,000 miles, the aircraft, flown by Squadron Leader J.D. Hewett and Mr C.E. Kay, took sixth place in the handicap race and fifth place in the speed race.

In the summer of 1934, the type entered service with UK-based airlines, with Hillman Airways Ltd being first to take delivery in July. 
The Anglo-Persian Oil Company was another early company to purchase the Rapide; used for quick communications purposes between individual oil fields spread out over vast distances, the aircraft quickly became popular in the oil industry, with the Iraq Petroleum Company and the Asiatic Petroleum Company also procuring their own Rapides.

From August 1934, Railway Air Services (RAS) operated a fleet of Dragon Rapides on routes linking London, the north of England and on to Northern Ireland and Scotland. The RAS DH.89s were named after places on the network, for example "Star of Lancashire". Isle of Man Air Services operated a fleet of Rapides on scheduled services from Ronaldsway Airport near Castletown to airports in north-west England including Blackpool, Liverpool and Manchester. Some of its aircraft had been transferred to it after operation by Railway Air Services.

During late 1935, the first of an initial batch of 16 Rapides were shipped to the manufacturer's Canadian branch, de Havilland Canada, for modification and re-sale purposes. Canadian aircraft received various changes, including an extended dorsal fin and a modified undercarriage arrangement, allowing for either wheels, skis, or floats to be interchangeably installed, dependent upon usage and weather conditions. The sole Canadian prototype, CF-AEO, was sold onto Quebec Airways in June 1935. Further Rapides were delivered to other customers in Canada, such as Canadian Airways, who used it on their West Coast and maritime routes.

On 30 January 1942, the majority of major Canadian operators were amalgamated into Canadian Pacific Air Lines, who continued to use the type. Further Canadian sales of the Rapide would occur both during and after the end of the Second World War.

During 1938, British operator Airwork Limited placed an initial order for nine Rapides to serve as navigation trainers. The order had been motivated by policy changes within the British Air Ministry, which sought to expand this capability. Repeat orders were placed by Airwork in the lead up to the Second World War, upon which point the firm's fleet of Rapides were all taken on by the Royal Air Force (RAF).

Edward, Prince of Wales (later Edward VIII), owned a single Dragon Rapide (G-ADDD), which he frequently used for carrying out his royal duties. He flew this aircraft to London on his accession as king in 1936, making him the first British monarch to fly.

In July 1936 a pair of British SIS agents, Cecil Bebb and Major Hugh Pollard, flew Francisco Franco in Rapide G-ACYR from the Canary Islands to Spanish Morocco, at the start of the military rebellion which began the Spanish Civil War. The aircraft involved has since been placed on public display in the Museo del Aire, Madrid, Spain.

Second World War

At the start of Second World War on 3 September 1939, all British civil transport aircraft were requisitioned by the Ministry of Aircraft Production. A number of Dragon Rapides were used to provide internal flights under the control of National Air Communications (NAC). Perhaps one of the most significant early uses of the Rapide during the war occurred during the crucial weeks of May–June 1940, in which the Battle of France occurred; Rapides of No. 24 Squadron acted as aerial couriers between Britain and France; out of 24 aircraft, 10 Rapides were lost during this intense period of fighting.

Following the closure of the NAC network, Dragon Rapides continued to fly for British airlines during the war as part of the Associated Airways Joint Committee (AAJC). Upon the outbreak of war, all civil services had been halted; however, some routes were progressively returned to operation as and when they were deemed of value to the war effort or found to be in the national interest. The AAJC co-ordinated the majority of UK's wartime scheduled services, which were entirely operated on over-water routes.

Other Dragon Rapides were impressed into service with the British armed forces as communications aircraft and training aircraft; Australian Rapides were also impressed by the Royal Australian Air Force (RAAF).

Furthermore, while the final production Rapide was completed in November 1941, de Havilland instead produced the military-orientated Dominie variant exclusively. Over 500 additional Dominies were manufactured for military use, powered by improved Gipsy Queen engines; by the end of production in July 1946, a total of 727 aircraft (both Rapides and Dominies combined) had been manufactured. During the war, Dominie production was performed by de Havilland and Brush Coachworks Ltd, the latter being responsible for the greater proportion of the work. The Dominies were mainly used by the Royal Air Force (RAF) and Royal Navy for radio and navigation training. Other duties they were used for included passenger and communications missions.

Throughout the course of the war, civilian Rapides were progressively replaced by Dominies as the type became available in greater quantities. Rapides were either dispatched to perform passenger operations or occasionally converted for other purposes, such as Air Ambulances; by the end of the conflict, only a total of nine impressed Rapides were restored to their civilian registrations; however, these were joined by many Dominies which had been deemed to be surplus to requirements.

Postwar operations

Postwar, the Dominie continued to be used for some time by Royal Naval air station flights as communications aircraft. By 1960, the Royal Navy still had a fleet of 14 Dominies, although under normal circumstances only three would be actively used at any one point in time, while the others were stored at RAF Lossiemouth, Moray, Scotland. The last of the Royal Navy's Dominies had been phased out of service during 1963; thirteen aircraft were subsequently sold on via public tender, a number of which having been converted to civil Rapide configurations.

Many ex-RAF survivors had quickly entered commercial service after the end of the conflict; according to aviation author Peter W. Moss, a typical Dominie-to-Rapide conversion performed by de Havilland involved the repainting of the exterior (replacing the wartime camouflage scheme) and the installation of sound proofing, upholstered seats and a new décor within the cabin area. Additionally, various third party companies offered and performed their own conversion schemes, including Field Aircraft Services, Airwork Limited, Air Enterprises, W.A. Rollason Limited and the Lancashire Aircraft Corporation (LAC). By 1958, 81 examples were recorded as still flying on the British register.

In the Netherlands, airline KLM, keen to restart operations, set about procuring a handful of Rapides even prior to the end of the war, commencing the first of its re-launched services during September 1945. Various British airlines also became prolific users of the type; British European Airways (BEA), formed on 1 January 1946, took order 39 Rapides during February 1947. BEA used many across its fledgling network, later focusing upon services within the Scottish, Scilly, and Channel Islands while gradually selling on displaced and excess aircraft via Airwork. Small independent British airlines that chose to resist pressure from the British government to merge into BEA also commonly operated the Rapide.

In order to better distinguish between the different standards of Rapides available in the post-war environment, de Havilland established a basic mark number system. Mk 1 aircraft were those constructed pre-war, while Mk 2 and Mk 3 Rapides were ex-military conversions to a six-passenger cabin and eight-passenger cabin respectively. Those Rapides that were re-engined with a pair of de Havilland Gipsy Queen engines, were referred to as Mk 4s.

By 1966, use of the Rapide had gone into decline and several formerly large operators had phased out the type completely. Due to the declining stocks of spare components available, individual Rapides were commonly being broken up in order to scavenge parts to maintain other active aircraft. Regardless, demand for such an aircraft was still relatively strong at this time, according to Moss.

The DH.89 proved an economical and durable aircraft, despite its relatively primitive plywood construction and many were still flying in the early 2000s. Several Dragon Rapides are operational in the UK, while multiple operators, including Classic Wings and Plane Heritage, offer pleasure flights in them to the general public. Shortly after the end of the Second World War, de Havilland introduced a Dragon Rapide replacement, the de Havilland Dove.

Variants

D.H.89 Twin-engined light transport biplane. First production version.
D.H.89A Improved version, fitted with a landing light in the nose, modified wing tips and cabin heating.
D.H.89A Series 4 D.H.89A aircraft converted to two de Havilland Gipsy Queen 2 piston engines, fitted with constant speed propellers.
D.H.89A Mk 5 One D.H.89A aircraft, powered by two de Havilland Gipsy Queen 3 piston engines, fitted with variable-pitch propellers.
D.H.89A Mk 6 One D.H.89A aircraft fitted with Fairey X5 fixed-pitch propellers.
D.H.89M  Military transport version. Exported to Lithuania and Spain.
D.H.89B Dominie Mk I Radio and navigation training version.
D.H.89B Dominie Mk II Communications and transport version.

Operators

Civil

 Zonas Oeste y Norte de Aerolíneas Argentinas (Z.O.N.D.A.)

 Adelaide Airways
 Australian National Airways
 Royal Flying Doctor Service of Australia
 Qantas Empire Airways

 Arco-Íris
 OMTA
 Varig
 British North Borneo Crown Colony of Sarawak Protectorate of Brunei
 Borneo Airways

 Canadian Airways
 Canadian Pacific
 Quebec Airways

 China National Aviation Corporation (CNAC)

 KNILM

 Misr Airlines

 Aero Oy operated two aircraft.

 Société Aigle Azur Indochine
 Cie de Transports Aérien Autrex
 Compagnie Laotienne de Commerce et de Transport

 Air Iceland

 Air India
 Indian National Airways
 Tata Airlines

 Government of Indonesia

 Iranian State Airlines

 Iraqi Airways

 Aer Lingus
 Aer Turas operated one aircraft.
East African Airways

 Valsts Gaisa satiksme - 2 

 Middle East Airlines

 KLM

 Air Travel (NZ) Ltd
 Mount Cook Airline
 National Airways Corporation
 Cook Strait Airways Ltd
 Union Airways
 West Coast Airways

 Palestine Airways (British Mandate of Palestine)
 Aviron

 Aerocarga Asociados ACA

 Transportes Aéreos de Timor

 LARES

 Comair (South Africa) operated 2 aircraft.

 Spanish Republican Air Force

 Iberia

 Swissair

 Aberdeen Airways
 Air Charter Limited
 Air Atlantique Classic Flight now the Classic Air Force
 Airviews Ltd
 Air Enterprises
 Air Kruise
 Allied Airways
 Blackpool and West Coast Air Services
 British Airways Ltd
 British American Air Services
 British Continental Airways
 British European Airways
 British Westpoint
 Classic Wings
 Crilly Airways Ltd
 East Anglian Flying Services
 Gibraltar Airways
 Great Western and Southern Airlines
 Hillmans Airways
 Highland Airways Limited
 Hunting Air Travel
 Island Air Services
 Isle of Man Air Services
 Jersey Airways
 Lancashire Aircraft Corporation
 Mayflower Air Services
 Melba Airways
 Morton Air Services
 North Eastern Airways
 Northern & Scottish Airways
 Northwest Airlines (UK)
 Olley Air Services
 Personal Airways
 Railway Air Services
  Scillonia Airways
 Scottish Airways
 Sivewright Airways
 Southampton Air Services
 Southern Airlines
 Starways
 Trans European Aviation
 United Airways
 Western Airways
 Westward Airways (Lands End)
 Yellow Air Taxis

 Aeroflot

 Aeroput

Military operators

 Royal Australian Air Force

 Belgian Air Force (Seven operated from 1946)

 Royal Canadian Air Force
 No. 418 Squadron RCAF

 Royal Egyptian Air Force

 Finnish Air Force

 Luftwaffe operated captured aircraft.

 Royal Indian Air Force

 Imperial Iranian Air Force

 Israeli Air Force

 Royal Jordanian Air Force

 Lithuanian Air Force operated two D.H.89M aircraft.

 Royal Netherlands Air Force – four D.H.89B Mark II (transports)
 No. 334 Squadron RNLAF (1944–1956)

 Royal New Zealand Air Force
 No. 4 Squadron RNZAF
 No. 42 Squadron RNZAF

 Peruvian Air Force

 Portuguese Air Force

 Southern Rhodesian Air Force – Four aircraft.

 South African Air Force

 Soviet Air Force used at least two DH.89, captured from Lithuanian Air Force during the occupation of the Baltics

 Spanish Republican Air Force operated three D.H.89M requisitioned from LAPE

 Spanish Air Force

 Turkish Air Force - three DH.89As.

 Royal Air Force
 No. 24 Squadron RAF
 No. 173 Squadron RAF
 No. 225 Squadron RAF
 No. 271 Squadron RAF
 No. 510 Squadron RAF
 No. 526 Squadron RAF
 No. 527 Squadron RAF
 No. 614 Squadron RAF
 Fleet Air Arm
 700 Naval Air Squadron
 701 Naval Air Squadron
 703 Naval Air Squadron
 736 Naval Air Squadron 
 739 Naval Air Squadron
 740 Naval Air Squadron
 744 Naval Air Squadron
 767 Naval Air Squadron
 776 Naval Air Squadron
 778 Naval Air Squadron
 781 Naval Air Squadron
 782 Naval Air Squadron
 787 Naval Air Squadron
 790 Naval Air Squadron
 799 Naval Air Squadron
 1832 Naval Air Squadron
 1844 Naval Air Squadron

 United States Army Air Forces

 Uruguayan Air Force

 Royal Yugoslav Air Force – One aircraft impressed into military service in 1940.

Accidents and incidents
 2 October 1934, G-ACPM of Hillman's Airways crashed into the sea off Folkestone, Kent causing the death of the pilot and the six passengers.
 30 December 1936, G-AEGS of the Iraqi Petroleum Petrol Transport Company overturned in a forced landing in Palestine, two killed.
 21 August 1937, CF-BBG Registered 10.6.37 to The Globe and Mail Ltd, Toronto. Named "The Flying Newsroom" and equipped with floats. Destroyed by fire whilst refuelling Toronto Air Harbour, Toronto, Ontario 21.8.37. Registration cancelled 21.8.37 (same day)
 3 July 1938, G-AEBX Star of Scotia of Railway Air Services crashed at Sydenham, Northern Ireland, two killed.
 20 June 1939, G-AERE operated by British American Air Services crashed in County Durham, England. John Crouch who was the king's jockey, the pilot and the wireless operator were all killed.
 27 May 1941, R5929 a Dominie of the Royal Air Force near Devizes, Wiltshire, England, seven killed.
 7 July 1941, R9563 a Dominie of the Royal Navy crashed in bad weather three miles North of Stonehaven, Aberdeenshire, Scotland, six killed.
 14 February 1942, R5927 a Dominie of the Royal Air Force hit a balloon cable and crashed near Colnbrook, Wiltshire, England, six killed.
 29 May 1942, VH-UXZ of Australian National Airways crashed near Flinders Island, Bass Strait, Australia following engine failure (probably through running out of fuel), four killed.
 20 July 1944, VH-UBN owned by the Australian Department of Civil Aviation, but leased to Guinea Airways, crashed at Mount Kitchener, South Australia, probably as the result of pilot disorientation in cloud, killing all seven on board.
 6 February 1945, SU-ABP of Misr Airwork crashed in Egypt, seven killed.
 1 April 1946, G-AERZ of Railway Air Services crashed in County Down, Northern Ireland, six killed.
 30 August 1946, X7394 a Dominie of the Royal Navy crashed at Scafell Pike, Cumberland, England in bad weather during an ambulance flight, five killed.
 15 April 1947, G-AHKR of British European Airways crashed into Slieau Ruy whilst operating a scheduled passenger flight from Speke Airport, Liverpool, Lancashire to Ronaldsway Airport, Isle of Man. There were only minor injuries amongst the six people on board.
 10 June 1948, G-AIUI of Hargreaves Airways crashed at Cronk ny Arrey Laa, Isle of Man. Seven of the nine people on board were killed. The aircraft was operating a scheduled passenger flight from Speke to Ronaldsway.
 11 November 1948, G-AKOF of Mannin Airways flying from Dublin, Ireland and unable to land at Ronaldsway diverted to Speke but ran out of fuel and crashed in River Mersey off Liverpool, England, eight killed.
 10 July 1951, G-ALXJ of the Air Navigation and Trading Company crashed into the Irish Sea off Laxey, Isle of Man, killing the pilot. The aircraft was operating a scheduled cargo flight from Squires Gate Airport, Blackpool, Lancashire to RAF Jurby instead of its normal destination of Ronaldsway Airport, which was fogbound.
 14 September 1952, G-AIZI crashed shortly after takeoff from Croydon Airport at Wallington, Surrey following a loss of power from the starboard engine. The pilot, the only person on board, was killed.
 19 February 1954, G-AFMF crashed at Simonburn Common near Hexham, Northumberland. The pilot and seven passengers escaped with minor injuries.
 29 June 1957, G-AGUE of Island Air Services crashed on takeoff from Ramsgate Airport, Kent on a local pleasure flight. The aircraft was written off, but all on board escaped uninjured.
 16 July 1960, OY-DZY of Zonens Redningskorps crashed shortly after takeoff from Copenhagen Airport, Denmark. The aircraft was chartered by the Danish Football Union to transport soccer players to a test match in Jutland. All eight passengers were killed; the pilot survived but had one leg amputated.
 11 August 2018, N683DH crashed shortly after takeoff from Abbotsford International Airport at the Abbotsford International Airshow.

Surviving aircraft

 F-AZCA is preserved in France (Amicale Jean Baptiste Salis at La Ferté Alais) Used for a double transatlantic flight in the late 1980s as an advertising vehicle for Blueway cigarettes. It is scheduled for restoration.
 G-ACPP, on display at the Reynolds-Alberta Museum Fame in Wetaskiwin Alberta. The fifth D.H.89 built, and started its career with Railway Air Services Ltd of Croydon, UK on 2 Feb. 1935 with the name 'City of Bristol'.  It is the oldest surviving D.H.89.
 G-ACYR, in Olley Air Service Livery, used to fly Franco from the Canary Islands in the first days of the Spanish Civil War, based at Museo del Aire (Madrid).
 G-ADAH, a DH89A in the livery of Allied Airways, is on display at the Museum of Science and Industry in Manchester, England.
 G-ADDD (was G-ACZE, N1934D), a DH89A currently undergoing restoration to flying condition at the Military Aviation Museum in Virginia Beach, Virginia.
 G-AEML / EC-AAY, a DH89A in the livery of Iberia, is airworthy and operated by the Fundación Infante de Orleans in Spain.
 G-AGJG, a DH89A, in the colours of Scottish Airways, is airworthy and in the hands of private owners at Duxford Airfield, Cambridge, England.
 G-AGSH, a DH89A, is airworthy with the Shuttleworth Collection in Old Warden, Bedfordshire. Was rebuilt and restored to her BEA colours by Cliff Lovell at Hants Light Plane Services.
 G-AGTM, a DH89A, is airworthy and was operated by the Classic Air Force before it closed in 2016.
 G-AHAG, a DH89A in the livery of Scillonia Airways, is airworthy and based at Membury airfield, Berkshire.
 G-AHXW, is under repair following its 2018 crash. Upon completion of will rejoin the Historic Flight Foundation Spokane, Washington.
 G-AIDL, a Mk 6, is airworthy and owned by Cirrus Aviation, painted as a Royal Air Force Dominie TX310, its former identity.
 G-AKIF and G-AIYR, a pair of DH89A Dragon Rapides, are airworthy and based at Duxford, England airfield for tourist flights.
 G-AKNV (last registration was OO-CNP), on display at the Royal Museum of the Armed Forces and Military History in Brussels.
 NR695 / N2290F, a DH89A, is on display at the National Museum of the United States Air Force, Dayton, Ohio.
 TC-ERK, a DH89A, is on display at the Istanbul Aviation Museum.
 ZS-JGV (CN8931), a DH89A is airworthy and is based in Queenstown in the Eastern Cape, South Africa.
 C-FAYE, known as Lady Faye, is on display at the Canadian Bushplane Heritage Centre in Sault Ste. Marie, Ontario.
 V-3, DH89B (CN6740), on display at the Nationaal Militair Museum, The Netherlands
 2304, DH89A (CN6430), operated by Força Aérea Portuguesa on display at the Museu do Ar, Sintra Portugal

Specifications (Dragon Rapide)

Notable appearances in media

A 1986 Spanish film, Dragon Rapide, covers its historical use by Generalissimo Francisco Franco during the preparation for the Spanish Civil War.

See also

References

Notes

Bibliography
 
 
 
 
 
 
 
 
 Gerdessen, Frederik. "Estonian Air Power 1918 – 1945". Air Enthusiast, No. 18, April – July 1982. pp. 61–76. .

External links

 Operators' reference drawing , 
 de Havilland Dragon Rapide  at the Military Aviation Museum

1930s British airliners
1930s British military utility aircraft
Dragon Rapide
Aircraft first flown in 1934
Biplanes
Twin piston-engined tractor aircraft